Archibald Colquhoun (1912–1964) was a leading translator of modern Italian literature into English. He studied at Ampleforth College, Oxford University, and the Royal College of Art. Originally a painter, he worked as director of the British Institute in Naples before the Second World War, and in Seville after the war. He worked in British intelligence during wartime. He later headed Oxford University Press' initiative to bring out Italian literary classics in translation. He scored his biggest success with Lampedusa's The Leopard, a translation that is still in print. He was also one of the first translators to introduce Italo Calvino to Anglophone readers. He was the first winner of the PEN Translation Prize, which he won for his translation of Federico de Roberto's The Viceroys. He also wrote a biography of Alessandro Manzoni.

According to Robin Healey's Twentieth-century Italian Literature in English Translation, Colquhoun was one of the top 10 translators of Italian literature of the last 70 years, alongside Patrick Creagh, Angus Davidson, Frances Frenaye, Stuart Hood, Eric Mosbacher, Isabel Quigly, Raymond Rosenthal, Bernard Wall and William Weaver.

Selected translations
 Alessandro Manzoni - The Betrothed
 Donato Martucci - The Strange September of 1950
 Federico de Roberto - The Viceroys (PEN Translation Award 1963)
 Francesco Jovine - The Estate in Abruzzi 
 Giuseppe Tomasi di Lampedusa - The Leopard
 Giuseppe Tomasi di Lampedusa - Places of My Infancy
 Giuseppe Tomasi di Lampedusa - The Siren and Selected Writings
 Giuseppe Tomasi di Lampedusa - Two Stories and a Memory
 Italo Calvino - The Path to the Spiders' Nests
 Italo Calvino - Adam, One Afternoon and Other Stories
 Italo Calvino - The Baron in the Trees
 Italo Calvino - The Nonexistent Knight & The Cloven Viscount
 Italo Calvino - Our Ancestors
 Italo Calvino - The Watcher and Other Stories
 Italo Svevo - A Life
 Leonardo Sciascia - The Day of the Owl (also as Mafia Vendetta)
 Mario Rigoni Stern - The Sergeant in the Snow
 Mario Pomilio - The New Line
 Mario Soldati - The Capri Letters
 Mario Tobino - The Mad Women of Magliano
 Renzo Rosso - The Bait and Other Stories 
 Teodoro Giuttari - White Nights in Gaol
 Ugo Pirro - The Camp-Followers
 The Lost Legions: Three Italian War Novels

References

1912 births
1964 deaths
20th-century British translators
Italian–English translators
Alumni of the Royal College of Art
People educated at Ampleforth College